Johann Gramann or Graumann (5 July 1487 – 29 April 1541), also known by his pen name Johannes Poliander, was a German pastor, theologian, teacher, humanist, reformer, and Lutheran leader.

Life 

Gramann was born in Neustadt an der Aisch, Middle Franconia. He worked as rector of the Thomasschule in Leipzig. Poliander was Johann Eck's secretary at the 1519 Leipzig Debate, where he met Martin Luther and joined the Protestant Reformation. Poliander became pastor of Altstadt Church in 1525 in Königsberg (Kaliningrad), capital of the new Duchy of Prussia (a fief of the Crown of Poland), succeeding the fiery Johannes Amandus.
The humanist was well-regarded by his peers, including the Catholic Johannes Dantiscus. He wrote secular and religious poetry in German and Latin. He was a strong advocate with Albert, Duke of Prussia, for the creation of the University of Königsberg. He donated his personal collection of 1,000 books to Altstadt's council; this became the foundation of the later Königsberg Public Library. He died in Königsberg.

Hymn 

Gramann's hymn "Nun lob, mein Seel, den Herren" was set by several composers. Johann Sebastian Bach used it in cantatas and organ preludes, including Gottlob! nun geht das Jahr zu Ende, BWV 28 for the Sunday after Christmas.

Sources

External links 

 
 Johann Gramann in Ökumenisches Heiligenlexikon 
 Biography of Gramann, Johann (Poliander) in the Evangelical Lutheran Hymnary Handbook
 Johann Gramann (Poliander) (Hymn-Writer) Bach-Cantatas
 Johannes Poliander in Kulturportal West – Ost 

1487 births
1541 deaths
16th-century German composers
16th-century German Lutheran clergy
Clergy from Bavaria
Clergy from Königsberg
German Lutheran theologians
German Protestant hymnwriters
People from Neustadt (Aisch)-Bad Windsheim
People from the Duchy of Prussia
People of the Protestant Reformation
Pseudonymous writers